Tamba delicata is a noctuoid moth in the family Erebidae first described by Louis Beethoven Prout in 1932.

Characteristics
The green patches on a variegated and fasciated grey ground distinguish this species from other congeners.

Distribution and habitat
It is found in Borneo, Sumatra, Peninsular Malaysia, and Java in the lowlands and hill forests.

References

Erebidae
Boletobiinae
Moths of Borneo
Moths described in 1932